is a Japanese manga series written and illustrated by Nobuyuki Fukumoto. It is a sequel to Fukumoto's manga Ten, set 20 years later. It has been serialized in Takeshobo's Kindai Mahjong since July 2019.

Publication
Yami-ma no Mamiya is written and illustrated by Nobuyuki Fukumoto. Fukumoto published a "chapter 0" in Takeshobo's Kindai Mahjong on May 1, 2019; it debuted as a serialized manga two months later in the same magazine on July 1. Takeshobo has collected its chapters into individual tankōbon volumes. The first volume was published on December 6, 2019. As of December 28, 2022, six volumes have been released.

Volume list

References

Mahjong in anime and manga
Nobuyuki Fukumoto
Seinen manga
Takeshobo manga